The banded toadfish (Aphos porosus) is a species of toadfish found along the Pacific coast of South America where it is found in Chile, Ecuador and Peru.  This species grows to a length of  TL. It is the only member of the monotypic genus Aphos. Unlike the other genus, Porichthys in this subfamily the banded toadfish lacks photophores.

References

Batrachoididae
Monotypic fish genera
Fish of the Pacific Ocean
Fish of Chile
Fish of Ecuador
Fish of Peru
Fish described in 1837